In rowing, there are no world records due to the variability of weather conditions. Instead there are world best times, which are set over the international rowing distance of 2000 meters.

Men's records
† denotes a performance that is also a current world best time.

Women's records
† denotes a performance that is also a current world best time.

References
Notes

Citations

Olympic records
Rowing-related lists